Pelham City Schools is the school district of Pelham, Alabama.

Pelham had separated from the Shelby County School System on July 1, 2014. The Shelby County officials stated that a separation would require people living in the separated municipality to go to that municipality's schools. A Change.org petition to have those faraway neighborhoods de-annexed from Pelham was established.

Schools
 Pelham High School
 Pelham Park Middle School
 Pelham Tree Elementary School
 Pelham Mountain Elementary School

References

External links
 Pelham City Schools
School districts in Alabama
Education in Shelby County, Alabama
2014 establishments in Alabama
School districts established in 2014